Rabindranath Tagore Nagar or simply R. T. Nagar is an area in Bangalore, India. It is situated in the northern part of the city. It is named after Rabindranath Tagore. It is part of the Bangalore North Lok Sabha Constituency and the Hebbal Assembly Constituency. R.T Nagar has two blocks, Block I and Block II. It became popular after the construction of the new airport at Devanahalli (Kempegowda International Airport)

Originally a tiny layout built by Bangalore Development Authority (BDA) in the 1970s and was surrounded by villages like Gangenhalli on the west, the military campus on the east, Matadahalli by south and parts of Hebbal village by north. But close proximity to other high-profile areas like Sadashivnagar and Dollar's colony (SanjayNagar) led to rapid development of RT Nagar. Also setting up of a Head post office on RT Nagar main road provided further impetus to the growth of RT Nagar. It is one of the posh areas in Bangalore.

Over the last few years RT Nagar has come to commonly represent many areas like MLA Layout, Gangenhalli (Ganganagar), Dinnur, SultanPalya, Kanakanagar, Manoranpalya and even Kavalabyrasandra simply because these areas fall under the RT Nagar head post office ( with Pin code 560032) jurisdiction. Even today many businesses in these areas actually show "RT Nagar post" as an address line item.

Notable natives and residents
S. R. Bommai  – Chief Minister, Karnataka, August 1988 – April 1989
Late R. Gundu Rao – Chief Minister, Karnataka, 1980 to 1983. His Son Dinesh Gundu Rao is a sitting MLA
Late Dharam Singh – Chief Minister, Karnataka, 2003 to 2006.
Veerappa Moily – Chief Minister, Karnataka, 1992–1994, former union law and petroleum and natural gas department minister
D.B. Chandre Gowda – Member of Parliament, Bangalore North Constituency

Commercial hubs

Major commercials hubs for businesses in RT Nagar are the RT Nagar Main Road (80 Ft road), Dinnur Main Road, Sultan Palya Main Road and Ganganagar 5th Main (with a sizable number of Marwari shops). Most of the commercial activities of the area are centered on the 80 Ft Main road. There are many more commercial shops in the RT Nagar Main road which includes many food buildings and shopping buildings.

Educational institutions

R.T.Nagar has many schools and pre-university Colleges, affiliated to CBSE/ISCE and the Karnataka State Board. Educational institutions include:
 Shaheen's Falcon PU College
 Williams International College
 Trillium Public School
 Modern Public English School
 Indian Public School
 Sri Rajiv Gandhi College of Dental Sciences and Hospital    
 Rajiv Gandhi Institute of Technology
 Kamala College of Nursing
 Sanjay Gandhi College of Education
 Florence Public School
 Mac Nay Doon's English School
 Adarsha Vidyalaya School
 Presidency School
 Navodaya Vidyaniketana
 St. Michael's School
 Vijaya Bharati Public School
 St. George's School
 Mamatha School
 Sri Vani School
 Newton Public School
 Adarsha Polytechnic
 R.T. Nagar Public School
 Mona Education Society
 Sidhartha School and College
 Everest Public school
 Kuppuaraju English school
 Sumangali Seva Ashram
 Hebbal Government School
 R.T Nagar Government High School
 Bright Kid Montessorie
 Kamala Girls High School
 Presidential School
 Narayana e-Techno School
 Matha school

Reference List

Geography of Bangalore
Memorials to Rabindranath Tagore
Neighbourhoods in Bangalore